The 2003 Grote Prijs Jef Scherens was the 37th edition of the Grote Prijs Jef Scherens cycle race and was held on 7 September 2003. The race started and finished in Leuven. The race was won by Thor Hushovd.

General classification

References

2003
2003 in road cycling
2003 in Belgian sport